Public Interest Disclosure Act  is a stock short title used in the United Kingdom and several Australian jurisdictions for legislation that is intended to protect whistleblowers:

Australia

Federal
The Public Interest Disclosure Act 2013 (Cth)

Australian Capital Territory
The Public Interest Disclosure Act 2012 (ACT)

Queensland
The Public Interest Disclosure Act 2010 (Qld)

Tasmania
The Public Interest Disclosures Act 2002 (Tas)

Western Australia
The Public Interest Disclosure Act 2003 (WA)

Northern Territory
The Public Interest Disclosure Act 2008 (NT)

United Kingdom
The Public Interest Disclosure Act 1998 (UK)

Lists of legislation by short title and collective title